New World Record is the sixth album by American alternative rock band Poster Children, released in 1999. It was the first album recorded in their own studio, Tedium. It was among the first albums made available for purchase in the MP3 format.

Critical reception
Tucson Weekly called New World Record "an album that gets closest to the ferocious energy the band generates on stage" and "the best thing they've put out since 1993's Tool." The Chicago Reader called the album "a striking left turn from a band that's produced more than its share of mediocre alternapop." CMJ New Music Report called it "melodic, punchy post-punk [that] works in the darker intensity of the band's famed live shows."

Track listing
 "Accident Waiting to Happen" – 3:56
 "6x6" – 3:35
 "Time to Kill" – 2:24
 "Ankh" – 3:54
 "Mr. Goodnight" – 3:17
 "Chemicals" – 4:42
 "Straightline" – 3:34
 "Planet Earth" – 2:56
 "Good Cop Bad Cop" – 3:57
 "Secret Handshake" – 4:50
 "Wait and See" – 4:00
 "Deadman" – 3:53

Personnel
Rick Valentin – Vocals, Guitar
Rose Marshack – Bass, vocals
Jim Valentin – Guitar
Howie Kantoff – Drums

References

Poster Children albums
1999 albums